Louisiana Channel is a non-profit web-TV channel based at the Louisiana Museum of Modern Art in Humlebaek, Denmark.

By the end of the first year, 28 November 2013, Louisiana Channel had published 130 videos featuring international artists, film makers, photographers, musicians, designers, architects and writers. By the end of October 2015 the number of videos exceeded 325. The videos are free for everyone to share.

Louisiana Channel's aim is international and about half of the views come from English speaking countries. The videos are generally artist portraits, talks, interviews, short documentaries or recordings of events around the world.

Artists 
Louisiana Channel currently has six categories: Art, Literature, Music, Design, Architecture and Most Viewed. The videos cover a variety of subjects - from singer-songwriter and poet Patti Smith's first encounters with photographer Robert Mapplethorpe to artist David Hockney's thoughts on photography and Photoshop. Another popular video is the interview with Serbian performance artist Marina Abramović, who offers advice to young artists and demonstrates how to turn an everyday moment into an extraordinary experience. Similarly, the videos featuring Japanese artist Yayoi Kusama, German filmmaker Wim Wenders and Danish architect Bjarke Ingels are also among the most viewed.

The videos feature a variety of personalities such as David Byrne, Anne Carson, Thomas Demand, Tara Donovan, Kerstin Ekman, Jonathan Safran Foer, Siri Hustvedt, Yayoi Kusama, Leigh Ledare, Jonathan Meese, Pipilotti Rist, Ugo Rondinone, Anri Sala, Gary Shteyngart, Henrik Vibskov, Bill Viola, Ai Weiwei, Paul Auster, Norman Foster, Joyce Carol Oates, Daniel Lanois, Michael Ondaatje, Olafur Eliasson, Margaret Atwood, Jonas Mekas and Jeff Wall.

History
Launched 28 November 2012, Louisiana Channel reached one million video views the first year. Patti Smith: Advice to the young is the most watched video, having gone viral when the actress Emma Watson tweeted the link to her six million followers. The video was seen by more than 50 000 people the following 24 hours. Yoko Ono: Celebrating her 80th birthday in Berlin is the second most viewed video, and the most discussed one, Yoko Ono's performance frequently being both criticized and defended on YouTube.

The Louisiana Channel videos are popular with bloggers and communities with special interests. Various photographic networks have shared David Hockney: Photoshop is boring, while Snöhetta: Memories of architectural landscapes and Superflex: A cool urban space were shared by international online magazines such as Archdaily. Günter Grass: Facebook is shit became very popular in the German newspapers as well as on Facebook itself, where many users defended the social network site.

References

Louisiana Museum of Modern Art presents Louisiana Channel
An introduction to Louisiana Channel by Huffington Post.
Nordea-fonden explains their support to Louisiana Channel. (in Danish)
KOPENHAGEN NEWS article on Louisiana Channel (in Danish)
KUNSTEN NU article on Louisiana Channel (in Danish)
Article on the launch of Louisiana Channel by DR - Danmarks Radio. (in Danish)
Article on the launch of Louisiana Channel by Politiken (in Danish)

External links
Louisiana Channel homepage

YouTube channels